A Man of Straw is a 1958 Italian drama film directed by Pietro Germi. It was entered into the 1958 Cannes Film Festival.

Cast
 Pietro Germi - Andrea
 Franca Bettoia - Rita
 Luisa Della Noce - Luisa
 Edoardo Nevola - Giulio
 Saro Urzì - Beppe
 Romolo Giordani - Caporetto
 Luciano Marin - Gino
 Mirella Monti - Rita's mother
 Renato Montalbano - Rita's boyfriend
 Milly
 Bruna Cealti
 Anna Gruber
 Ida Masetti
 Marcella Rovena

References

External links

1958 films
1950s Italian-language films
1958 drama films
Films set in Rome
Films directed by Pietro Germi
Films scored by Carlo Rustichelli
1950s Italian films